Venkateswarier Neelakantan (born Thirunellai Venkateswarier Neelakantan on 7 June 1941) was an Indian cricketer. He was a right-handed batsman who played for Kerala. He was born in Palghat.

Neelakantan made a single first-class appearance for the side, during the 1965-66 season, against Andhra. From the tailend, he scored 13 not out in the only innings in which he batted.

External links
Venkateswarier Neelakantan at Cricket Archive 

1941 births
Living people
Indian cricketers
Kerala cricketers
Cricketers from Palakkad